Kurt-Tucholsky-Preis is a literary prize of Germany. The prize amount is currently €5,000.

The prize, for "committed and succinct literary works" was first awarded in 1995, and thereafter annually till 1997, since when it has been awarded every two years. It is targeted on short form works including Essays, Satire, Song, Treatises and Pamphlets. Texts should "verify reality, disclose backgrounds and help the reader towards a critical evaluation".

Since 2003 the Kurt-Tucholsky-Gesellschaft (Kurt Tucholsky Society) has been awarding the prize. The Foundation remains closely involved with the administration of the prize, but after the copyright on Tucholsky's writings lapsed it was no longer able to fund the prize.

Recipients

 1995: Konstantin Wecker
 1996: Heribert Prantl
 1997: Kurt Marti
 1999: Daniela Dahn
 2001: 
 2003: 
 2005: Erich Kuby
 2007:  and 
 2009: Volker Weidermann
 2011: Deniz Yücel
 2013: 
 2015: 
 2017: 
 2019: Margarete Stokowski
 2021:

Notes

References

External links

German literary awards